"All Falls Down" is a song by American hip hop artist Kanye West.

All Falls Down may also refer to:
 "All Falls Down" (Alan Walker song)
 "All Falls Down", a song by Machine Head from the 2013 album Through the Ashes of Empires
 "All Falls Down", a song by Adelitas Way from the 2009 self-titled debut album
 "All Falls Down", a song by California Breed from the 2014 self-titled album
 "All Falls Down", a two-part episode from season 10 of Degrassi

See also
 All Fall Down (disambiguation)
 We All Fall Down (disambiguation)
 "If It All Falls Down", a song from the 1986 Jimmy Buffett album Floridays
 "When It All Falls Down", a song by Ten Years After from the 2004 album Now